Lloyd Evans (born 14 December 1995) is an English professional rugby union player who plays as fly-half for Premiership Rugby club Gloucester Rugby.

Career

Club
In November 2013 Evans made his senior debut for Gloucester in an Anglo-Welsh Cup game against Northampton Saints. In May 2015 he made his Premiership debut as a 60th minute replacement against Bath.

On 16 May 2017, Evans signed his first professional contract to remain with Gloucester at Kingsholm Stadium from the 2017-18 season.

International
Evans represented the England under-18 team. He was a member of the England under-20 squad at the 2015 World Rugby Under 20 Championship and played in pool matches against Japan and Wales. He featured as a replacement during the final as England finished runners up to New Zealand.

Evans also qualifies to represent Wales through his father Huw Evans a former chairman of Scarlets.

References

External links
Gloucester Rugby Profile

1995 births
Living people
English rugby union players
English people of Welsh descent
Gloucester Rugby players
People educated at Dean Close School
Rugby union players from Gloucester
Rugby union fly-halves